Heinrich Wölfflin (21 June 1864 – 19 July 1945) was a Swiss art historian, esthetician and educator, whose objective classifying principles ("painterly" vs. "linear" and the like) were influential in the development of formal analysis in art history in the early 20th century. He taught at Basel, Berlin and Munich in the generation that raised German art history to pre-eminence. His three great books, still consulted, are Renaissance und Barock (1888), Die Klassische Kunst (1898, "Classic Art"), and Kunstgeschichtliche Grundbegriffe (1915, "Principles of Art History"). 

Wölfflin taught at Berlin University, from 1901 to 1912; Munich University, from 1912 to 1924; and Zurich University, from 1924 until his retirement.

Origins and career 
Wölfflin was born in Winterthur, Switzerland, and is buried in Basel. His father, Eduard Wölfflin, was a professor of classical philology who taught at Munich University and helped found and organize the Thesaurus Linguae Latinae.  Wölfflin studied art history and history with Jakob Burckhardt at the University of Basel, philosophy with Wilhelm Dilthey at Berlin University, and art history and philosophy at Munich University where his father had taught. He received his degree from Munich University in 1886 in philosophy, although he was already on a course to study the newly minted discipline of art history.

Wölfflin's principal philosophy mentor at the University of Munich, where Wölfflin got his doctoral degree, was the renowned professor of archaeology Heinrich Brunn. Greatly influenced by his mentors, particularly neo-Kantian Johannes Volkelt (Der Symbolbegriff) and Heinrich Brunn, his dissertation, Prolegomena zu einer Psychologie der Architektur (1886), already showed the approach that he was later to develop and perfect: an analysis of form based on a psychological interpretation of the creative process. It is considered now to be one of the founding texts of the emerging discipline of art history, although it was barely noted when it was published. 

After graduating in 1886, Wölfflin published the result of a years' travel and study in Italy, as his Renaissance und Barock (1888), already showed the approach that he was later to develop and perfect, he pursued his method in books on the Renaissance and Baroque periods. For Wölfflin, the 16th-century art now described as "Mannerist" was part of the Baroque aesthetic, one that Burckhardt before him as well as most French and English-speaking scholars for a generation after him dismissed as degenerate. On the death of Jacob Burckhardt in 1897 Wöllflin succeeded him in the Art History Chair at Basel. He is credited with having introduced the teaching method of using twin parallel projectors in the delivery of art history lectures, so that images could be compared when magic lanterns became less dangerous. Sir Ernst Gombrich recalled being inspired by him, as well as Erwin Panofsky. 

Notable students of Wölfflin include Klara Steinweg.

Principles of Art History 
In Principles of Art History, Wölfflin formulated five pairs of opposed or contrary precepts in the form and style of art of the sixteenth and seventeenth centuries which demonstrated a shift in the nature of artistic vision between the two periods. These were:
 From linear (draughtsmanship, plastic, relating to contour in projected ideation of objects) to painterly (malerisch: tactile, observing patches or systems of relative light and of non-local colour within shade, making shadow and light integral, and allowing them to replace or supersede the dominance of contours as fixed boundaries.)
 From plane to recession: (from the 'Will to the plane', which orders the picture in strata parallel to the picture plane, to planes made inapparent by emphasising the forward and backward relations and engaging the spectator in recessions.)
 From closed (tectonic) form to open (a-tectonic) form (The closed or tectonic form is the composition which is a self-contained entity which everywhere points back to itself, the typical form of ceremonial style as the revelation of law, generally within predominantly vertical and horizontal oppositions; the open or atectonic form compresses energies and angles or lines of motion which everywhere reach out beyond the composition, and override the horizontal and vertical structure, though naturally bound together by hidden rules which allow the composition to be self-contained.)
 From multiplicity to unity: ('Classic art achieves its unity by making the parts independent as free members, and the baroque abolishes the uniform independence of the parts in favour of a more unified total motive. In the former case, co-ordination of the accents; in the latter, subordination.' The multiple details of the former are each uniquely contemplated: the multiplicity of the latter serves to diminish the dominance of line, and to enhance the unification of the multifarious whole.)
 From absolute clarity to relative clarity of the subject: (i.e. from exhaustive revelation of the form of the subject, to a pictorial representation which deliberately evades objective clearness in order to deliver a perfect rendering of information or pictorial appearance obtained by other painterly means. 

Wölfflin was following in the footsteps of Vasari, among others, in devising a method for distinguishing the development in style over time.  He applied this method to Trecento, Quattrocento and Cinquecento art in Classic Art (1899), then developed it further in The Principles of Art History (1915). Wolfflin's Principles of Art History has recently become more influential among art historians and philosophers of art. The Journal of Aesthetics and Art Criticism, published a special issue commemorating the 100th anniversary of the publication of the Principles in 2015, edited by Bence Nanay.

Works
H. Wölfflin. Principles of Art History. The Problem of the Development of Style in Later Art, Translated from 7th German Edition (1929) into English by M D Hottinger (Dover Publications, New York 1932 and reprints).
H. Wöllflin. Classic Art. An Introduction to the Italian Renaissance. Translated from the 8th German Edition (Benno Schwabe & Co, Basle 1948) by Peter and Linda Murray (Phaidon Press, London 1952, 2nd Edn 1953).
H. Wölfflin. Die Kunst Albrecht Dürers (The Art of Albrecht Dürer), (F Bruckmann, Munich 1905, 2d Edn 1908).
H. Wölfflin. Die Bamburger Apokalypse: Eine Reichenauer Bilderhandschrift vom Jahre 1000 (The Bamburg Apocalypse: A Reichenau illuminated manuscript from the year 1000), (Kurt Wolff, Munich 1921).
H. Wölfflin. Italien und das deutsche Formgefühl (Italy and the German sense of Form), (1931).
H. Wölfflin. Gedenken zur Kunstgeschichte (Thoughts on Art History), (1941).
H. Wöllflin. Kleine Schriften (Shorter Writings), (1946).

References

Sources
Joan Goldhammer Hart, Heinrich Wölfflin:  An Intellectual Biography, Dissertation, UC Berkeley, 1981, available through University Microfilms. 
Joan G. Hart, "Reinterpreting Wölfflin:  Neo-Kantianism and Hermeneutics, in Art Journal, winter 1982, Vol. 42, no. 4, pp. 292–300.
Joan Hart, Relire Wölfflin, Louvre Museum Cycle de conferences, 1993, Ecole nationale superieure des Beaux-Arts publication, 1995.
Joan Hart, "Some Reflections on Wölfflin and the Vienna School," in Wien und die Entwicklung der Kunsthistorischen Methode, XXV International Kongress fur Kunstgeschichte Wien, 1983, Hermann Bohlaus, 1984.
Joan Hart, Heinrich Wölfflin, Encyclopedia of Aesthetics, Oxford Univ. Press, Vol. 4, 1998.
Joan Hart, "Heuristic Constructs and Ideal Types:  The Wölfflin/Weber Connection," in German Art History and Scientific Thought:  Beyond Formalism (ed.s Mitchell B. Frank and Daniel Adler), Surrey,UK:  Ashgate, 2012, pp. 57–72.
M. Lurz. Heinrich Wöllflin: Biographie einer Kunsttheorie (Worms am Rhein 1981)

External links
 
 Rykov, A. “Formalism, Avant-garde, Classics. Heinrich Woelfflin as an Art Theorist” in Proceedings of the History Department of Saint-Petersburg University. Vol. 22. 2015. pp. 155–160. (in Russian) 
Public domain works; full text online:Kunstgeschichtliche GrundbegriffeDie Kunst Albrecht Dürers''

1864 births
1945 deaths
Swiss art critics
Swiss art historians
Swiss architectural historians
Recipients of the Pour le Mérite (civil class)